The 1942 United States Senate election in New Hampshire took place on November 3, 1942. Incumbent Republican Senator Styles Bridges won re-election to a second term in office, defeating Democratic former Governor Francis P. Murphy.

Primary elections were held on September 15, 1942.

Republican primary

Candidates
Styles Bridges, incumbent Senator since 1937
Arthur J. Gruenler

Results

Democratic primary

Candidates
Francis P. Murphy, former Governor of New Hampshire (1937–1941)

Results

General election

Candidates
Styles Bridges, incumbent Senator since 1937 (Republican)
Francis P. Murphy, former Governor of New Hampshire (Democratic)

Results

See also 
 1942 United States Senate elections

References

Bibliography
 

1942
New Hampshire
United States Senate